"Radio Waves" is a song recorded by American country music group Eli Young Band.  It was released in June 2009 as the third single from the album Jet Black & Jealous.  The song reached number 35 on the Billboard Hot Country Songs chart.  The song was written by Mike Eli and Blu Sanders.

Content
"Radio Waves" is an up-tempo song in which the male narrator is reflecting on a past relationship with regret. The narrator sings the song to former lover over the radio, hoping to reconcile the relationship.

Critical reception
The song has garnered favorable critical reception. Country music website the 9513 reviewer Juli Thanki gave the song a "thumbs up". Thanki noted the band's decision to release a more up-tempo song following the slower previous two singles was a good one. Thanki also mentions the intro recalls "Til I Hear It from You" by Gin Blossoms. She does say the "song is one of the worst on the new album" but concedes "it is far from unlistenable". She goes on to say the song sounds like something Jakob Dylan would do, which "is a not a bad thing".

Chart performance
The song debuted at number 56 on the Billboard Hot Country Songs chart on the chart dated July 25, 2009.

References

2008 songs
2009 singles
Eli Young Band songs
Show Dog-Universal Music singles
Songs about radio